Nemorincola is a Gram-negative, strictly aerobic, rod-shaped and non-motile  genus of bacteria from the family of Chitinophagaceae with one known species (Nemorincola caseinilytica). Nemorella caseinilytica has been isolated from forest soil.

References

Chitinophagia
Bacteria genera
Monotypic bacteria genera
Taxa described in 2018